This is a list of vehicles designed called ZiL, a Russian maker of passenger cars, trucks, and military vehicles.

Production
ZiL has produced armored cars for most Soviet leaders, as well as buses, armoured fighting vehicles, and aerosani. The company also produced hand-built limousines and high-end luxury sedans (автомобиль представительского класса, literally "representative class vehicle", but also translated as "luxury vehicle") in extremely low quantities, primarily for the former Soviet and current Russian government officials. ZiL passenger cars were priced at the equivalent of models by Maybach and Rolls-Royce, but are largely unknown outside the Commonwealth of Independent States, and production rarely exceeded a dozen cars per year.

Executive cars and limousines

 ZIS-101 (1936-1939)
 ZIS-101A (1939-1941)
 ZIS-102 (1937-1939, convertible version of ZIS-101)
 ZIS-110 (1945-1957)
 ZIS-115 (1949-1955, armoured version of ZIS-110)
 ZIL-MZ (prototype sub-compact convertible, 1962)
 ZIL-111 (1959-1962)
 ZIL-111G (1962-1967)
 ZIL-114 (1967-1978)
 ZIL-115 (1972)
 ZIL-117 (1971-1978, shortened ZIL-114)
 ZIL-4102 (prototype, 1988)
 ZIL-4104 (1978-1983)
 ZIL-4105 (1988-1989, armoured version of ZIL-41047)
 ZIL-41041 (1985, five-seat version of ZIL-41047)
 ZIL-41042 (station wagon version of ZIL-4104)
 ZIL-41044 (1981, convertible version of ZIL-4104)
 ZIL-41045 (1983-1985, upgraded ZIL-4104)
 ZIL-41046 (1983-1985, communication car based on ZIL-4104)
 ZIL-41047 (1985-2002, 2010)
 ZIL-41072 (1989, escort version of ZIL-41047)
 ZIL-4112R (2012)

Trucks

 AMO-F-15 (1924, produced in agreement with Fiat, based on the Fiat F-15 ter)
 :ru:АМО-2 (1930)
 AMO-3 (1931)
 AMO-7 (1932, prototype tractor-trailer based on AMO-3)
 ZIS-5 (1933-1948)
 ZIS-6 (1934-1941, three-axle version of ZIS-5)
 ZIS-10 (1938-1941, tractor-trailer version of ZIS-5)
 ZIS-11 (1934, extra long wheelbase version of ZIS-5)
 ZIS-12 (1934-1941, long wheelbase version of ZIS-5)
 ZIS-13 (1936-1939, gas generator version, based on ZIS-14)
 ZIS-14 (1934, long wheelbase version of ZIS-5)
 ZIS-15 (prototype modernized replacement for ZIS-5, 1938; cancelled due to WWII)
 ZIS-18 (gas generator version; similar to ZIS-13 but based on the ZIS-5)
 ZIS-19 (1939-1946, construction dump truck based on ZIS-5) - later built by MMZ
 ZIS-20 (prototype construction dump truck based on ZIS-5)
 ZIS-21 (1939-1941, gas generation version based on ZIS-5, powered by wood gas)
 ZIS-22 (Halftrack, 1940-1941, based on the ZIS-5)
 ZIS-23 (three axle prototype based on the ZIS-15)
 ZIS-24 (four-wheel-drive prototype based on the ZIS-15)
 ZIS-30 (1940-1943, multifuel version of ZIS-5)
 ZIS-31 (gas generation version based on ZIS-5, powered by coal gas)
 ZIS-32 (1941, 4x4 version of the ZIS-5)
 ZIS-33 (1940, halftrack, based on the ZIS-5)
 ZIS-36 (1944, prototype 6x6 version of ZIS-5)
 ZIS-41 (1940, simplified version of ZIS-21)
 ZIS-42 (Halftrack, 1942-1944, based on the ZIS-5)
 ZIS-43 (1944, armed version of ZIS-42)
 ZIS-50 (1946, re-engined ZIS-5)
 ZIS-120N (1956, tractor-trailer version of ZIS-150)
 ZIS-121 (1952-1959, tractor-trailer version of ZIS-151)
 ZIS-128 (1954, prototype for ZIL-131)
 ZIS-E134 (1955, prototype off road vehicle)
 ZIS-150 (1948-1958)
 ZIS-151 (1948-1958, three-axle version of ZIS-150)
 ZIS-153 (1952, prototype halftrack based on ZIS-151)
 ZIS-156 (1949-1957, gas generator version of ZIS-150)
 ZIS-253 (1947, prototype 3.5 ton truck)
 ZIS-585 (1949-1955, dump-truck version of ZIS-150) - built by MMZ
 ZIL-130 (1964-1994, production moved to Ural Automobiles and Motors)
 ZIL-131 (1966-1994, production moved to Ural Automobiles and Motors)
 ZIL-132 (1960, prototype off road vehicle)
 ZIL-133 (1975-2000, three-axle version of ZIL-130)
 ZIL-134 (1957, prototype off road vehicle)
 ZIL-135 (1959-1963, military transport and self-propelled artillery truck) - production moved to BAZ
 ZIL-136 (1957, prototype off road vehicle)
 ZIL-137 (1970, prototype off road tractor-trailer based on ZIL-131) - built by BAZ
 ZIL-138 (1977-1987, LPG powered version of ZIL-130)
 ZIL-157 (1958-1978, production moved to Ural Automobiles and Motors)
 ZIL-157R (1957, prototype off road vehicle based on ZIL-157)
 ZIL-164 (1957-1964, improved ZIS-150)
 ZIL-164N (1957-1961, tractor trailer version of ZIL-164)
 ZIL-165 (1958, prototype for ZIL-131)
 ZIL-166 (1961-1966, gas generator version of ZIL-164)
 ZIL-E-167 (1963)
 ZIL-169G (prototype for ZIL-4331)
 ZIL-E169A (1964, prototype cab-over truck)
 ZIL-170 (1969, prototype for KamAZ-5320)
 ZIL-175 (1969, two-axle version of ZIL-170, prototype for Kamaz)
 ZIL-485 (amphibious vehicle based on ZIS-151)
 ZIL-553 (cement mixer based on ZIL-164)
 ZIL-555 (1964, dump truck based on ZIL-130)
 ZIL-585 (1957-1966, dump truck based on ZIL-164)
 ZIL-2502 (dump truck based on ZIL-5301)
 ZIL-3302 (1992, prototype truck based on ZIL-119)
 ZIL-3906
 ZIL-4305 (1983, prototype truck based on ZIL-4104)
 ZIL-4327 (2004?)
 ZIL-4331 (1987-2017)
 ZIL-4334 (1994-2014)
 ZIL-4514 (dump truck based on ZIL-133)
 ZIL-4972
 ZIL-5301 "Bychok" ("Little Bull") (1996)
 ZIL-5901 (1970)
 ZIL-6404 (1997)
 ZIL-6309 (2000)
 ZIL-6409 (2000)
 ZIL-432720
 ZIL-432930 (2004)
 ZIL-433180 (2004)
 ZIL-436200 (2010)

Buses

 AKZ-1 (1947-1948, based on ZIS-150 truck with ZIS-16 body)
 AMO-4 (1932-1934, based on the AMO-3)
 ZIS-lux (prototype, based on the ZIS-6, 1934)
 ZIS-8 (1934-1938, based on the ZIS-11)
 ZIS-16 (1938-1942, based on the ZIS-5)
 ZIS-17 (prototype, based on the ZIS-15, 1939)
 ZIS-44 (based on the ZIS-5)
 ZIS-127 (1955-1961)
 ZIL-129 (short-range version of ZIS-127)
 ZIS-154 (1946–1950)
 ZIS-155 (1949–1957)
 ZIL-118 "Yunost" (1962-1970, based on ZIL-111)
 ZIL-119 (1971-1994, based on ZIL-118; also called ZIL-118K)
 ZIL-158 (1957-1959, based on ZIL-164; production moved to LiAZ)
 ZIL-159 (1959, prototype rear-engine version of ZIL-158)
 ZIL-3207 (1991-1999, based on ZIL-41047)
 ZIL-3250 (1994–2012, based on ZIL-5301)

Sport and racing cars

 ZIS-101 Sport (1939)
 ZIS-112/1 (1951, based on ZIS-110)
 ZIS-112/2 (1956)
 ZIS-112/3 (1956)
 ZIL-112/4 (1957)
 ZIL-112/5 (1957, lengthened ZIL-112/4)
 ZIL-112 Sports (1961)
 ZIL-412 S (1962)

Other vehicles

 B-3 half-tracked transporter
 ZIS-152 armored personnel carrier
 PES-1 amphibious vehicle (1966)
 ZIL-PKU-1 pneumatic tracked off-road vehicle (1965)
 ZIL-SHN-1 Amphibious Screw Vehicle (1968)
 ZIL-2906 Amphibious Screw Vehicle 
 ZIL-4904 Amphibious Screw Vehicle 
 ZIL-49042 prototype for "Bluebird" (1973)
 ZIL-4906 (1975?) "Bluebird" 6-wheeled amphibious vehicle, designed to carry the ZIL-2906. Used for the recovery of Soyuz capsules. 
 ZIL-49061 (1975-1991) "Bluebird" Amphibious rescue vehicle, passenger version of the ZIL-4906. Used for the recovery of Soyuz crews.
 ZIS-LTA Half-track forest vehicle based on ZIS-5 and KT-12; later versions were based on ZIS-21 and ZIS-150 (1949-1951?)

References

ZiL